Prince Diponegoro Monument is a bronze equestrian statue of the Javanese Prince Diponegoro boldly riding a horse. The statue is located at Merdeka Square, Jakarta, in the northern part of the park. The statue symbolizes Diponegoro's leadership of his people against the Dutch colonial rulers during the Java War of 1825-1830. The statue was designed by an Italian sculptor Vittorio Di Colbertaldo. It was donated to Indonesia in 1965 by Dr. Mario Pitto, a wealthy Italian businessman who had served as the Italian consul-general to Indonesia in the early 1960s.

References

Cited works

Buildings and structures completed in 1967
Monuments and memorials in Jakarta
Post-independence architecture of Indonesia
Buildings and structures in Jakarta
Central Jakarta